The Roman Catholic Diocese of Fushun is a suffragan Latin diocese in the Ecclesiastical province of the metropolitan of Shenyang 瀋陽 in PR China.

Its cathedral episcopal see is a Cathedral of St. Joseph, located in the city of Fushun.

History 
 Established on February 4, 1932 as the Apostolic Prefecture of Fushun 撫順, on territory split off from the Apostolic Vicariate of Shenyang 瀋陽
 Promoted on February 13, 1940 as Apostolic Vicariate of Fushun 撫順
 April 11, 1946: Promoted as Diocese of Fushun 撫順, ending its missionary exempt, pre-dicoesan status, yet it still depends on the missionary Roman Congregation for the Evangelization of Peoples.

Ordinaries 
(all Roman Rite)

Apostolic Prefect of Fushun 撫順 
 Fr. Raymond Aloysius Lane, M.M. (April 14, 1932 – February 13, 1940 see below)

Apostolic Vicar of Fushun 撫順 
 Raymond Aloysius Lane, M.M. (see above February 13, 1940 – April 11, 1946 see below), Titular Bishop of Hypæpa (1940.02.13 – 1946.04.11)

Suffragan Bishops of Fushun 撫順 
 Raymond Aloysius Lane, M.M. (see above April 11, 1946 – August 7, 1946); later Superior General of Catholic Foreign Mission Society of America (Maryknoll Fathers) (1946.08.07 – retired 1956.08.06)
 ''Vacant since 7 August 1946, without Apostolic Administrator.

Sources and external links

 GCatholic.org, with titular incumbent biography links
 Catholic Hierarchy

Roman Catholic dioceses in China
Christian organizations established in 1932
Roman Catholic dioceses and prelatures established in the 20th century
Christianity in Liaoning